The 2005 French Figure Skating Championships took place between 10 and 12 December 2004 in Rennes. Skaters competed in the disciplines of men's singles, women's singles, pair skating, and ice dancing on the senior level. The event was used to help determine the French team to the 2005 World Championships and the 2005 European Championships.

Competitors from Italy, Monaco, and the United States also participated; however, the below results reflect only the French competitors.

Results

Men

Ladies

Pairs

Ice dancing

External links
 results

2004 in figure skating
French Figure Skating Championships, 2005
French Figure Skating Championships
French Figure Skating Championships
French Figure Skating Championships